During the Commonwealth of England, Scotland and Ireland, called the Protectorate, the Scottish burghs of Lanark, Glasgow, Rutherglen, Rothesay, Renfrew, Ayr, Irvine and Dunbarton were jointly represented by one Member of Parliament in the House of Commons at Westminster from 1654 until 1659. Elections were held at Glasgow.

List of Members of Parliament

References

Constituencies in the Parliament of England
Historic parliamentary constituencies in Scotland (Westminster)
Constituencies established in 1654
Constituencies disestablished in 1659
1650s in Scotland
1654 establishments in Scotland